Palos Verdes Peninsula Unified School District (PVPUSD) is a school district headquartered in Palos Verdes Estates, California with facilities in all four cities of the Palos Verdes Peninsula.

History
The Palos Verdes School District (PVSD) formed on January 26, 1925 as an elementary school district officially when unincorporated Palos Verdes withdrew from the Los Angeles City Elementary School District. The District began by serving 26 students from kindergarten through 8th grade in its first facility set up in two rooms above a drug store in Malaga Cove Plaza. High school students were sent out of the District to attend Los Angeles City schools in Redondo Beach. The first official school on the Peninsula, Malaga Cove School, opened in 1926 followed by Miraleste School in 1929. The school district continued to grow and, between 1955 and 1965, enrollment went from 2,285 to 13,204 students.

Attempts to form a unified school district on the Peninsula, which would provide an educational program for all K-12 students to attend school on the Peninsula failed to pass in 1953, 1954, and 1957. Finally, in October of 1960, voters elected to form a unified school district. On July 1, 1961, PVSD officially unified and became the Palos Verdes Peninsula Unified School District (PVPUSD). In September 1961 Palos Verdes High School, the first public high school on the Peninsula, opened with an enrollment of 2,043 students.

By 1973 enrollment in the District reached a high of 17,836 students resulting in serious overcrowding. Various measures were used to address the issue including redrawing attendance boundaries. The District also studied the viability of a year-round schedule with double sessions, extended-day sessions, reduction of high school graduation requirements and the purchase of portable classrooms.

PVPUSD changed greatly in the 1970s largely due to changes in the way the District was funded. Prior to 1972, most District income came from local property taxes which were based on assessed property value. In 1974 however, student enrollment became the most important factor in determining District income. While the District had a high enrollment in 1973, the next year enrollment started to drop thus reducing the District's funding.

Due to budget shortfalls, the District cut student programs and started to lay off its teachers in 1975. Local efforts to increase revenue limits per student were defeated. Through 1979, the District made further reductions in its staffing, closed facilities and cut student programs including sports. In 1992, Miraleste High School and Palos Verdes High School were closed and all high school students on the Peninsula were funneled to the former Rolling Hills High School campus, re-named Peninsula High School. 

As of October 2016, the PVPUSD serves the four cities on the Peninsula as well its unincorporated areas with enrollment of approximately 11,500 students. The District includes: two early childhood centers, ten elementary schools, three intermediate schools, two high schools and one continuation school. 

In 1992 84.5% of relevant voters voted approved Proposition Z to move the Los Angeles Unified School District (LAUSD) portion of Rancho Palos Verdes to PVPUSD but Stephen E. O'Neil, a judge of the Los Angeles Superior Court, blocked the transfer.

In 2019 the district began admitting students whose grandparents live on the Peninsula. It did so after enrollment declined by 500 students over the previous five years, causing a 10% decline in revenue.

Governance
The district is headed by a superintendent - Alex Cherniss - and governed by a five-person, publicly elected school board.

The current board members are:
 Ami Ghandi (term expires in 2024)
 Linda Reid (term expires in 2024)
 Linda Kurt (term expires 2026)
 Sara Deen (term expires in 2026)
 Julie Hamill (term expires in 2026)

Attendance areas
 The PVPUSD serves the cities of Palos Verdes Estates, Rancho Palos Verdes, Rolling Hills, and Rolling Hills Estates.
 Parts of the city of Rancho Palos Verdes, known as Eastview, are served both by the PVPUSD, and the Los Angeles Unified School District (LAUSD).  Two LAUSD-owned schools fall within the city of Rancho Palos Verdes: Dodson Middle School and Crestwood Elementary School.
 In 1999, an optional attendance boundary was agreed upon by the two school districts in which residents in Eastview could opt to either send their children to PVPUSD schools or LAUSD schools. Middle school-aged students in the area may attend Miraleste Intermediate School and high school-aged students attend both Palos Verdes Peninsula High School in Rolling Hills Estates and Palos Verdes High School in Palos Verdes Estates.
 Students whose parent or guardian works on the Palos Verdes peninsula or is a member of the United States military, or whose grandparents live in the district, may attend PVPUSD schools.

Demographics

In 1985, there were 1,365 students born outside of the United States. 346 were from Japan, 214 were from Taiwan, 150 were from Korea, and others originated from several countries including Iran, Mexico, other countries in Latin America, and the Philippines. In 1988, the district had 1,559 students born outside of the United States. 434 were from Japan, 249 were from Taiwan, and 193 were from Korea.

Schools
There are three high schools, Palos Verdes Peninsula High School (formerly called Rolling Hills High School), Palos Verdes High School (the latter located just a half block from the Pacific Ocean) and Rancho Del Mar High School (located on Crest Road in Rolling Hills).  In the 1970s - 1980s the high schools were: Palos Verdes High School, Rolling Hills High School, and Miraleste High School.

Primary schools

Preschools
 Miraleste Early Learning Academy
 Valmonte Early Learning Academy

Elementary schools
 Cornerstone Elementary School
 Dapplegray Elementary School 
 Lunada Bay Elementary School
 Mira Catalina Elementary School
 Montemalaga Elementary School
 Point Vicente Elementary School
 Rancho Vista Elementary School
 Silver Spur Elementary School
 Soleado Elementary School
 Vista Grande Elementary School

Intermediate schools
 Miraleste Intermediate School
 Palos Verdes Intermediate School
 Ridgecrest Intermediate School

High schools
 Palos Verdes High School - Grades 9-12
 Palos Verdes Peninsula High School - Grades 9-12
 Rancho Del Mar High School - Continuation

References

External links

 Palos Verdes Peninsula Unified School District
 Peninsula Education Foundation

 
School districts in Los Angeles County, California
Unified School District